The 2019 Russian Women's Curling Cup was held from December 18 to 22 at the Ice Cube Curling Center arena in Sochi.

All games played are 8 ends.

All times are listed in Moscow Time (UTC+03:00)

Teams

Round-robin results and standings

Group A

Group B

Playoffs

Semifinals
December 21, 7:40 pm

Third place
December 22, 10:00 am

Final
December 22, 10:00 am

Final standings

References

External links

See also
2019 Russian Men's Curling Cup

Russian Women's Curling Cup
Russian Women's Curling Cup
Women's Curling Cup
Russian Women's Curling Cup
Sports competitions in Sochi